Phil MacHugh (born 20 March 1985 in Glasgow, Scotland) is a Scottish television presenter, media personality and media consultant.

Early life
MacHugh's uncle is Mick MacNeil of Simple Minds. From the age of 15 he began appearing on Gaelic television. Later he was involved with Smash Hits TV, BBC Scotland's @Ire and Dè a-nis?, and BBC Choice's Beyond 2000. He was also a music presenter for Splaoid and Nochd Gun Chadal.

Career
After a career break to study journalism at Edinburgh's Napier University, MacHugh did a stint for E4 Edinburgh Festival coverage and contributed to entertainment news at Channel 5. He also filmed strands for a Scottish TV magazine show You have to do this..., and appeared in the VisitScotland Tartan Week in New York City for NBC, presenting live daily coverage from Grand Central Station during the two-week festival. He also scripted and presented a one-off feature for the popular BBC One countryside show Landward, filmed at the Royal Highland Show in Edinburgh.

In 2022 he co-presented the BBC travel show Martin Compston's Scottish Fling with Compston, a longtime friend.

As an actor, MacHugh played the main character Seumas in CBBC Scotland's children's programme SNAS, based around a Scottish rock band. He also played James in the BBC Drama Consider the Lilies.

MacHugh is also a Highland dancer and has been involved in VisitScotland and Glasgow City Council promotions at International Celtic festivals across the world, and in November 2007 worked for the Lithuanian Television Network LNK and businessman Vladimir Romanov on the Baltic version of the popular TV show Strictly Come Dancing as a creative director. Romanov won the Celebrity Dance competition.

In 2013 MacHugh joined the Yes Campaign movement as a PR and Events Manager to head up the commercial campaign for an Independent Scotland. In 2016 he set up SKAPA, which specialises brand PR. SKAPA clients include Pentahotels Group, Living Ventures, Principal Hotels, Barbour and Toni & Guy.

Personal life
In 2009 MacHugh was the 50th on The Scotsmans 50 Most Eligible Bachelors. A Celebrity Torch Bearer for the 2012 Summer Olympics, he ran in Edinburgh as part of the UK torchbearing celebrations.

References

1985 births
Living people
Mass media people from Glasgow